A list of the films produced in Mexico in 1961 (see 1961 in film):

1961

External links

1961
Films
Mexican